Neopragmatism, sometimes called post-Deweyan pragmatism, linguistic pragmatism, or analytic pragmatism, is the philosophical tradition that infers that the meaning of words is a result of how they are used, rather than the objects they represent.

The Blackwell Dictionary of Western Philosophy (2004) defines "neo-pragmatism" as "A postmodern version of pragmatism developed by the American philosopher Richard Rorty and drawing inspiration from authors such as John Dewey, Martin Heidegger, Wilfrid Sellars, W. V. O. Quine, and Jacques Derrida".  It is a contemporary term for a philosophy which reintroduces many concepts from pragmatism. While traditional pragmatism focuses on experience, Rorty centers on language. The self is regarded as a "centerless web of beliefs and desires". 

It repudiates the notions of universal truth, epistemological foundationalism, representationalism, and epistemic objectivity. It is a nominalist approach that denies that natural kinds and linguistic entities have substantive ontological implications. Rorty denies that the subject-matter of the human sciences can be studied in the same ways as we study the natural sciences. 

It has been associated with a variety of other thinkers including Hilary Putnam, W. V. O. Quine, and Donald Davidson, though none of these figures have called themselves "neopragmatists". The following contemporary philosophers are also often considered to be neopragmatists: Nicholas Rescher (a proponent of methodological pragmatism and pragmatic idealism), Jürgen Habermas, Susan Haack, Robert Brandom, and Cornel West.

Background

"Anglo-analytic" influences 
Neopragmatists, particularly Rorty and Putnam, draw on the ideas of classical pragmatists such as Charles Sanders Peirce, William James, and John Dewey. Putnam, in Words and Life (1994) enumerates the ideas in the classical pragmatist tradition, which newer pragmatists find most compelling. To paraphrase Putnam:
Complete skepticism (the notion that a belief in philosophical skepticism requires as much justification  as other beliefs);
Fallibilism (the view that there are no metaphysical guarantees against the need to revise a belief);
Antidualism about "facts" and "values";
That practice, properly construed, is primary in philosophy. (WL 152)

Neopragmatism is distinguished from classical pragmatism (the pragmatism of James, Dewey, Pierce, and Mead) primarily due to the influence of the linguistic turn in philosophy that occurred in the early and mid-twentieth century. The linguistic turn in philosophy reduced talk of mind, ideas, and the world to language and the world. Philosophers stopped talking about the ideas or concepts one may have present in one's mind and started talking about the "mental language" and terms used to employ these concepts. In the early twentieth century philosophers of language (e.g. A.J. Ayer, Bertrand Russell, G.E. Moore) thought that analyzing language would bring about the arrival of meaning, objectivity, and ultimately, truth concerning external reality. In this tradition, it was thought that truth was obtained when linguistic terms stood in a proper correspondence relation to non-linguistic objects (this can be called "representationalism"). The thought was that in order for a statement or proposition to be true it must give facts which correspond to what is actually present in reality. This is called the correspondence theory of truth and is to be distinguished from a neo-pragmatic conception of truth.

There were many philosophical inquiries during the mid-twentieth century which began to undermine the legitimacy of the methodology of the early Anglo-analytic philosophers of language. W. V. O. Quine in Word and Object, originally published in 1960, attacked the notion of our concepts having any strong correspondence to reality. Quine argued for ontological relativity which attacked the idea that language could ever describe or paint a purely non-subjective picture of reality. More specifically, ontological relativity is the thesis that the things we believe to exist in the world are wholly dependent on our subjective, "mental languages". A 'mental language' is simply the way words which denote concepts in our minds are mapped to objects in the world.

Quine's argument for ontological relativity is roughly as follows:
 All ideas and perceptions concerning reality are given to our minds in terms of our own mental language.
 Mental languages specify how objects in the world are to be constructed from our sense data.
 Different mental languages will specify different ontologies (different objects existing in the world).
 There is no way to perfectly translate between two different mental languages; there will always be several, consistent ways in which the terms in each language can be mapped onto the other.
 Reality apart from our perceptions of it can be thought of as constituting a true, object language, that is, the language which specifies how things actually are.
 There is no difference in translating between two mental languages and translating between the object language of reality and one's own mental language.
 Therefore, just as there is no objective way of translating between two mental languages (no one-to-one mapping of terms in one to terms in the other) there is no way of objectively translating (or fitting) the true, object language of reality into our own mental language.
 And therefore, there are many ontologies (possibly an infinite number) that can be consistently held to represent reality.
(see Chapter 2, in Word and Object).

The above argument is reminiscent of the theme in neopragmatism against the picture theory of language, the idea that the goal of inquiry is to represent reality correctly with one's language.

A second critically influential philosopher to the neo-pragmatist is Thomas Kuhn who argued that our languages for representing reality, or what he called "paradigms", are only as good as they produce possible future experiments and observations. Kuhn, being a philosopher of science, argued in The Structure of Scientific Revolutions  that "scientific progress" was a kind of a misnomer; for Kuhn, we make progress in science whenever we throw off old scientific paradigms with their associated concepts and methods in favor of new paradigms which offer novel experiments to be done and new scientific ontologies. For Kuhn 'electrons' exist just so much as they are useful in providing us with novel experiments which will allow us to uncover more about the new paradigm we have adopted. Kuhn believes that different paradigms posit different things to exist in the world and are therefore incommensurable with each other. Another way of viewing this is that paradigms describe new languages, which allow us to describe the world in new ways. Kuhn was a fallibilist; he believed that all scientific paradigms (e.g. classical Newtonian mechanics, Einsteinian relativity) should be assumed to be, on the whole, false but good for a time as they give scientists new ideas to play around with. Kuhn's fallibilism, holism, emphasis on incommensurability, and ideas concerning objective reality are themes which often show up in neopragmatist writings.

Wilfrid Sellars argued against foundationalist justification in epistemology and was therefore also highly influential to the neopragmatists, especially Rorty.

"Continental" influences

Philosophers such as Derrida and Heidegger and their views on language have been highly influential to neopragmatist thinkers like Richard Rorty. Rorty has also emphasised the value of "historicist" or "genealogical" methods of philosophy typified by Continental thinkers such as Foucault.

Wittgenstein and language games 
The "later" Ludwig Wittgenstein in the Philosophical Investigations argues contrary to his earlier views in the Tractatus Logico-Philosophicus that the role of language is not to describe reality but rather to perform certain actions in communities. The language-game is the concept Wittgenstein used to emphasize this. Wittgenstein believed roughly that: 
 Languages are used to obtain certain ends within communities.
 Each language has its own set of rules and objects to which it refers. 
 Just as board games have rules guiding what moves may be made so do languages within communities where the moves to be made within a language game are the types of objects that may be talked about intelligibly.
 Two people participating in two different language-games cannot be said to communicate in any relevant way.

Many of the themes found in Wittgenstein are found in neopragmatism. Wittgenstein's emphasis of the importance of "use" in language to accomplish communal goals and the problems associated with trying to communicate between two different language games finds much traction in neopragmatist writings.

Richard Rorty and anti-representationalism 
Richard Rorty was influenced by James, Dewey, Sellars, Quine, Kuhn, Wittgenstein, Derrida, and Heidegger. He found common implications in the writings of many of these philosophers, as he believed that these philosophers were all in one way or another trying to hit on the thesis that our language does not represent things in reality in any relevant way. Rather than situating our language in ways in order to get things right or correct Rorty says in the Introduction to the first volume of his philosophical papers that we should believe that beliefs are only habits with which we use to react and adapt to the world. To Rorty getting things right as they are "in themselves" is useless if not downright meaningless.

In 1995, Rorty wrote: "I linguisticize as many pre-linguistic-turn philosophers as I can, in order to read them as prophets of the utopia in which all metaphysical problems have been dissolved, and religion and science have yielded their place to poetry." This "linguistic turn" strategy aims to avoid what Rorty sees as the essentialisms ("truth," "reality," "experience") still extant in classical pragmatism. Rorty wrote: "Analytic philosophy, thanks to its concentration on language, was able to defend certain crucial pragmatist theses better than James and Dewey themselves. [...] By focusing our attention on the relation between language and the rest of the world rather than between experience and nature, post-positivistic analytic philosophy was able to make a more radical break with the philosophical tradition."

Distinguished from idealism and epistemic relativism 

One way to understand the motivation and themes of the neopragmatist is to understand how neopragmatism (and pragmatism in general) distinguishes itself from both idealism and relativism. Neopragmatism is to be distinguished from idealism primarily in the fact that it does not, like idealism, believe that what is actually in the world is affected in any way by what individuals believe concerning it. Neopragmatism holds to the doctrine of a mind-independent reality while simultaneously maintaining that this world is not knowable in the classical Cartesian sense of the word "know". The neopragmatist views mind-independent reality to causally influence people's minds but whatever way that influence may be on the individual mind is up to the individual. Neopragmatism is to be distinguished from epistemic relativism on the force of the idea that in order to be an epistemic relativist one must be concerned about getting one's ideas "right" in relation to reality. The neopragmatist thesis views this to be a concern which is of no use and therefore is to be discarded. Neopragmatists hold that it makes no sense to talk about getting reality right due to the fact that this adds no utility to do so. The neopragmatist is concerned with developing beliefs and habits which allow one to adapt to one's environment with success rather than generating pictures used in order to describe reality. Since neopragmatism lacks any concern for generating descriptive pictures of reality the whole question of epistemic relativism is meaningless.

See also 
 Conceptual pragmatism
 Confirmation holism
 Constructivist epistemology
 Direct and indirect realism
 Fallibilism
 Linguistic turn
 Ontological pluralism
 Philosophy and the Mirror of Nature, the foundational text of the tradition
 Postanalytic philosophy

Notes

References
 Hylton, Peter, "Willard van Orman Quine", The Stanford Encyclopedia of Philosophy (Summer 2013 Edition), Edward N. Zalta (ed.), URL = <http://plato.stanford.edu/archives/sum2013/entries/quine/>.

Further reading 
 Randall Auxier, Eli Kramer, and Krzysztof Piotr Skowroński, eds., (2019).  Rorty and Beyond, Lexington.
 Krzysztof Piotr Skowroński (2015).  Values, Valuations, and Axiological Norms in Richard Rorty's Neopragmatism, Lexington.

External links 
 Neo-pragmatist Philosophy of Education

Epistemological theories
Pragmatism
Metatheory